The National Solar Observatory (NSO) is a United States federally funded research and development center to advance the knowledge of the physics of the Sun. NSO studies the Sun both as an astronomical object and as the dominant external influence on Earth.
NSO is headquartered in Boulder and operates facilities at a number of locations - at the 4-meter Daniel K. Inouye Solar Telescope in the Haleakala Observatory on the island of Maui, at Sacramento Peak near Sunspot in New Mexico, and  six sites around the world for the Global Oscillations Network Group one of which is shared with the Synoptic Optical Long-term Investigations of the Sun.

NSO provides its observations to the scientific community. It operates facilities, develops advanced instrumentation both in-house and through partnerships, conducts solar research, and carries out educational and public outreach.

Visiting the observatories 
The National Solar Observatory HQ is located on the campus of the University of Colorado, Boulder. It also has some staff on Maui, and Sacramento Peak.

Telescopes operated by the observatory

Big Bear Solar Observatory 
 Synoptic Optical Long-term Investigations of the Sun

Haleakala Observatory 
 Daniel K. Inouye Solar Telescope

Sacramento Peak 
 See Sunspot Solar Observatory for the telescopes located there

Global 
 Global Oscillation Network Group

Directors 

A list of all NSO directors since the founding of the observatory is given below.

History
The Sacramento Peak observatories were proposed by Donald Menzel of the Harvard College Observatory in 1947, when the U.S. Air Force commissioned a site survey for a suitable facility that would study the higher regions of the Earth's atmosphere. The site, near White Sands Proving Ground, was chosen in 1948. The first equipment to be operated by the Harvard Observatory was installed in 1949, a  prominence camera, and a flare patrol camera, installed in the Grain Bin Dome.

These instruments were followed by the Evans Solar Facility, or Big Dome, which housed a  coronograph and spectrograph. In 1963 the Hilltop Dome was built to house additional instruments.

The Sacramento Peak facilities are located in Sunspot, New Mexico. The site's name was chosen by the late James C. Sadler, (1920–2005), an internationally noted meteorologist and professor at The University of Hawaii, formerly with the United States Air Force on assignment during the early inception of the observatory.

For the Solar eclipse of August 21, 2017, NSO enlisted the cooperation of various groups in the Citizen CATE (Continental-America Telescopic Eclipse) experiment to set up more than 60 identical telescopes along the eclipse path, to produce 90 continuous minutes of images, 10 seconds apart, of the Sun's inner corona. This was to provide a clearer understanding of solar plumes and other transient phenomena.

See also
 List of astronomical observatories

References

Further reading

External links 
 Daniel K. Inouye Solar Telescope
 NSO Integrated Synoptic Program
 

Astronomy in the United States
Astronomy institutes and departments
Astronomical observatories in Arizona
Astronomical observatories in New Mexico
Buildings and structures in Otero County, New Mexico
Buildings and structures in Pima County, Arizona
Federally Funded Research and Development Centers
Laboratories in the United States
National Science Foundation
Science and technology in Colorado
Science and technology in Hawaii
Science and technology in the United States
Research institutes in Colorado
Solar observatories
Tourist attractions in Otero County, New Mexico
University of Colorado Boulder
1952 establishments in the United States